The House That Shadows Built (1931) is a feature compilation film from Paramount Pictures, made to celebrate the 20th anniversary of the studio's founding in 1912. The film was a promotional film for exhibitors and never had a regular theatrical release.

The film includes a brief history of Paramount, interviews with various actors, and clips from upcoming projects (some of which never came to fruition). The title comes from a biography of Paramount founder Adolph Zukor, The House That Shadows Built (1928), by William Henry Irwin.

Marx Brothers segment
The film is best known for a six-minute segment starring the Marx Brothers (Groucho Marx, Harpo Marx, Chico Marx and Zeppo Marx), with Ben Taggart playing Mr. Lee, Theatrical Producer, which was intended to promote their forthcoming 1931 film Monkey Business (Clark also played the role of the frustrated Passport Official in Monkey Business and would later appear in the war scene in Duck Soup).

The segment, containing material which was never included in any other Marx Brothers film, is a re-working of the first scene of their first successful Broadway revue I'll Say She Is (1924), which Groucho considered to have been the funniest work in the Brothers' career.

Except for some name changes and a few additional gags, the scene is nearly the same as the script used for the stage production. A few of the gags from I'll Say She Is were worked into the lobby scene in The Cocoanuts (1929), and a bit involving a series of Maurice Chevalier imitations was incorporated into the script of Monkey Business.

The Marx Brothers' segment is currently available as a special feature on the direct-to-DVD documentary film Inside the Marx Brothers, albeit in poor condition. Marx Brothers fans sometimes refer to their segment simply as I'll Say She Is, in light of its source material.

Scenes from silent Paramount films
Several films presented are now considered lost.  The clips presented represent the only known surviving footage.

Silent film performers in unidentified silent films
George M. Cohan, possible films: Broadway Jones (1917), Seven Keys to Baldpate (1917), and Hit-The-Trail Holliday (1918) 
George Beban 
Elsie Ferguson, possible films: The Lie (1918) and The Avalanche (1919)
Dorothy Dalton 
Marguerite Clark, film clip likely from Snow white (1916)
Billie Burke, film clip is most definitely from The Land of Promise (1917)
Ethel Clayton 
Lila Lee
Pauline Frederick 
Bryant Washburn  
Irene Castle

The Lon Chaney Sr. segment is one of only two short sequences which survive from The Miracle Man (1919). The other clip is featured in one of Paramount's Movie Milestone series, Movie Memories (1935), showcasing the studios' greatest achievements.  This latter clip shows both a segment from the conclave in Chinatown as well as the healing scene which is in The House That Shadows Built. A nitrate print of Movie Memories is reportedly at the UCLA Film and Television Archive but has not yet been preserved.

Then-current Paramount stars
The film moves on to show segments with Paramount players of the 1931–32 season, including George Bancroft, Nancy Carroll, the Four Marx Brothers, Charles "Buddy" Rogers, Clive Brook, Phillips Holmes, Sylvia Sidney, Eleanor Boardman, Frances Dee, Jackie Searl, Kay Francis, Judith Wood, Regis Toomey, Peggy Shannon, Jackie Coogan, Lilyan Tashman, Eugene Pallette, Anna May Wong, Juliette Compton, Stuart Erwin, William Boyd, Miriam Hopkins, Wynne Gibson, Jack Oakie, Ginger Rogers, Robert Coogan, Carmen Barnes, Charlie Ruggles, Richard "Skeets" Gallagher, Mitzi Green, Richard Arlen, Carole Lombard, Fredric March, Claudette Colbert, Paul Lukas, Tallulah Bankhead, Gary Cooper, Ruth Chatterton, Marlene Dietrich, and Maurice Chevalier.

These stars are announced as appearing in upcoming films, including some never produced or released by Paramount:
An Entirely Different Woman with Marlene Dietrich (never produced, based on the German novel Eine ganz andere Frau by Georg Froschel)
No One Man from the Rupert Hughes novel
Daughter of the Dragon with Anna May Wong, Warner Oland, and Sessue Hayakawa
24 Hours with Clive Brook, Kay Francis, and Regis Toomey
Girls About Town with Kay Francis, Lilyan Tashman, and Eugene Pallette
Dr. Jekyll and Mr. Hyde with Fredric March and Miriam Hopkins
Personal Maid with Nancy Carroll
Uncertain Woman with Claudette Colbert (based on Edgar Wallace novel The Girl from Scotland Yard, never produced)
The Road to Reno with Charles "Buddy" Rogers and Lilyan Tashman
The Round-Up with Eugene Pallette, Stuart Erwin, Skeets Gallagher, and Frances Dee (not produced by Paramount until 1941)
Silence with Clive Brook, Marjorie Rambeau, and Peggy Shannon
A Farewell to Arms with Gary Cooper and Eleanor Boardman (Helen Hayes replaced Boardman in the final film)
My Sin with Tallulah Bankhead and Fredric March
Ladies of the Big House
Huckleberry Finn with Jackie Coogan, Mitzi Green, Junior Durkin, and Jackie Searl
Rich Man's Folly with George Bancroft
The Man With Red Hair (horror film based on novel Portrait of a Man With Red Hair by Hugh Walpole, never produced)
The Lives of a Bengal Lancer filmed by Ernest B. Schoedsack (not made until 1935, using footage shot in India by Schoedsack in 1931)
Tomorrow and Tomorrow with Ruth Chatterton

Scenes are shown that were shot for the following films:
An American Tragedy with Phillips Holmes, Sylvia Sidney, and Frances Dee
Secrets of a Secretary with Claudette Colbert, Herbert Marshall, and Georges Metaxa
Sooky directed by Norman Taurog, with Jackie Cooper and Robert Coogan
Murder by the Clock with William Boyd, Lilyan Tashman, Regis Toomey, and Irving Pichel
Monkey Business with the Marx Brothers (see above section)
Stepdaughters of War with Ruth Chatterton and directed by Dorothy Arzner (never released)
The Smiling Lieutenant directed by Ernst Lubitsch with Maurice Chevalier, Claudette Colbert, Charlie Ruggles, and Miriam Hopkins

See also
A Trip to Paramountown (1922 promotional film made by Paramount)

References

External links

clip from Monkey Business trailer

1931 films
1931 documentary films
American documentary films
Black-and-white documentary films
1930s English-language films
Paramount Pictures films
American black-and-white films
Compilation films
Marx Brothers
Cultural depictions of Maurice Chevalier
Promotional films
1930s American films